Sling furniture is usually a suspended, free-swinging chair, bed, or hammock that is made of a framework connected to hanging straps or rope. When attached to poles or a frame for carrying, a sling becomes a stretcher, a simple form of litter.

See also
 Sex swing
 Swing (seat)

External links 
 

Furniture
Portable furniture